Beachwood Canyon is a community in the Hollywood Hills, in the northern portion of Hollywood in Los Angeles, California. The upper portion of the canyon is the Hollywoodland community that was advertised in the 1920s by the original of what is now known as the Hollywood Sign. The neighborhood features its own market, cafe, private mailbox rental, florist and stables.

History

Home to more than 22,000 residents, Beachwood Canyon was first developed in the 1920s by a syndicate composed of West Hollywood's founder, Gen. M. H. Sherman; Los Angeles Times publisher Harry Chandler; and real estate mogul Sidney Woodruff (who also developed Dana Point). The architects and landscapers who developed the enclave drew inspiration from the southern regions of France, Italy and Spain, as well as the turreted castles of Germany, building in the Storybook house architectural style

Film directors have favored the canyon over the years, so movies such as the original Invasion of the Body Snatchers (1956) were filmed there, with terrorized masses running down Belden Drive.

Notable residents (past and present)

Steve Agee, comedian, actor, writer
Kevin Bacon, actor
Ned Beatty, actor
Jamie Bell, actor
Jack Black, actor 
Humphrey Bogart, actor
Adam Carolla, radio and television personality
Guy Chambers, English songwriter and record producer
Steve Coogan, English comic actor
Charlie Chaplin
David Cook, Musician and winner of American Idol
Chris D'Elia, American actor and comedian
Mac Danzig, American mixed-martial artist
William De Los Santos, poet, screenwriter and film director
Peter Deuel, actor
Dean Delray, comedian and actor
Alexandre Desplat, composer
Minnie Driver, actress
Gustavo Dudamel, Music Director of the Los Angeles Philharmonic
Fred Durst, musician
James Duval, actor
Peg Entwistle, Broadway actress who died by suicide from atop the HOLLYWOODLAND sign in 1932
Peter Freeman, multi-instrumentalist and music producer
Anna Friel, actress
Halsey, singer
George Furth, actor
Troy Garity, actor
Kim Gardner, singer and restaurateur 
Heather Graham, actress
Aldous Huxley, English writer and novelist
Laura Huxley, author and lecturer
Maynard James Keenan, singer and songwriter
Anna Kendrick, actress 
Anthony Kiedis, singer and songwriter
Mila Kunis, actress
Heath Ledger, actor
Sharmagne Leland-St. John, poet, author, filmmaker, concert performer
David Livingston, Television Director and Producer
Bela Lugosi, actor
Lykke Li, singer 
Madonna, singer, actress, and director
Jason Mantzoukas, actor
Ray Manzarek, singer and songwriter
Chris Matthews, political commentator
Jack McBrayer, actor
Thomas Middleditch, actor
Moby, Musician, DJ, and photographer
D.W. Moffett, actor, writer, and director
Jack Nitzsche, musician, composer
Hal Ozsan, actor
Teresa Palmer, actress
Keanu Reeves, actor
Margot Robbie, actress and film producer 
William N. Robson, musician and radio producer
Howard A. Rodman, screenwriter and novelist
Samantha Ronson, DJ
Axl Rose, musician
Camille Rowe, model
Andy Samberg, comedian, and Joanna Newsom, musician
Ben Schwartz, comedian, actor
Grant Show, actor
Jessica Simpson, singer, actor
Brooke Smith, actress
Michael Sopkiw, actor
Ralph Story, radio and television personality
Harry Styles, musician and actor
John Taylor, musician
David Thewlis, actor
Louis Tomlinson, singer
Peter Tork, singer
Dean Torrence, singer
Robert Townsend, actor and director
Mayra Veronica, singer and author, Miss USO
Antonio Villaraigosa, Former California gubernatorial candidate and former mayor of Los Angeles
Jack Webb, actor
Jane Wiedlin, guitarist and member of the all female band The Go-Go's
Forest Whitaker, actor, director and producer
Hana Vu, singer and songwriter
Charli XCX, singer
Bobby Lee, comedian, actor

Education
The neighborhood is zoned to LAUSD schools.
 Cheremoya Elementary School
 Le Conte Middle School
 Hollywood High School

References

External links
 Los Angeles Times, Real Estate section, Neighborly Advice column: "[Beachwood Canyon:] Serene, scenic enclave born in 'Hollywoodland' days" (7 Dec 2003)
Beachwood Canyon Neighborhood Association

Neighborhoods in Los Angeles
Hollywood Hills
Populated places in the Santa Monica Mountains